is a 1993 fighting arcade game developed by Scarab and published by Sammy. It uses digitized images of real actors with blood and gore, similar to Midway's arcade hit Mortal Kombat.

Ports for the Super NES and Sega Genesis were announced in early 1994, but quietly cancelled the following year. The monks from Viper's stage later appeared in Dyna Gear, another arcade game developed by Scarab and published by Sammy.

Gameplay

Survival Arts is quite similar to Midway's Mortal Kombat franchise in terms of presentation, but with gameplay inspired by Capcom's Street Fighter II. The player's character fights against their opponent in best two-out-of-three matches in a single player tournament mode with the computer or against another human player. Players have a character roster of eight fighters to choose from the start, each with their own fighting style and special techniques. One unique feature is that players can pick up multiple weapons (from swords to guns) that are dropped on stage and use against the opponent. Depending on what move or weapon the player uses as the last hit against the opponent while it knocks them out, the defeated opponent will either be burned, disassembled, sliced in half in two different ways, decapitated or electrocuted, which is as simple as performing deaths in Barbarian: The Ultimate Warrior.  While combos can be performed in the game, they can end with a death, which makes it a precursor to the "Brutalities" in Mortal Kombat 3 and some of its successors.

Plot
The birthplace of the powerful physical martial arts called "Survival Arts" and how they were earned became mysterious for quite some time. However, eight warriors spreading over different countries have learned some of the most important skills of the Survival Arts, while they continue learning more about them. Each one qualified for the Survival Arts tournament to see which survivor will win and obtain all the secrets of the Arts.

There are nine characters in the game.

Reception 
Play Meter listed Survival Arts to be the fifty-eighth most-popular arcade game at the time.

References

External links
Survival Arts  at The Large Cult Fighting Game March 

Survival Arts at arcade-history

1993 video games
Arcade video games
Arcade-only video games
Cancelled Sega Genesis games
Cancelled Super Nintendo Entertainment System games
Fighting games
Mortal Kombat clones
Multiplayer and single-player video games
Sammy games
Video games about ninja
Video games developed in Japan
Video games with digitized sprites